New titles were released on the 2nd and 4th Tuesdays of a four-week month, or 3rd and 5th Tuesdays of a five-week month. If the Tuesday was a public holiday, the update will be on Wednesday instead. The games were announced by Nintendo of Korea one week prior to release. This service stopped getting new games in April 2009.

Nintendo discontinued the Wii Shop Channel on January 31, 2019, with the purchase of Wii points for new games having ended on March 26, 2018.

Available titles
The following is the complete list of the 40 Virtual Console titles that were available for the Wii in South Korea sorted by system and release date.

Nintendo Entertainment System
There were 23 games available.

Super Nintendo Entertainment System
There were 13 games available.

Nintendo 64
There were 4 games available.

See also
 List of Virtual Console games for Nintendo 3DS (South Korea)

References

Virtual Console games for Wii
Virtual Console games for Wii
Virtual Console games for Wii